The Centre for Studies and Training for Development (Centre d'études et de formation pour le Développement), CEFOD, is a centre established by the Jesuits in Chad in 1966 near the beginning of independence at the request of the Head of State François Tombalbaye, to offer training to Chadian professionals in the economic and social field.

Departments
CEFOD is organized into four departments:
 Department of Documentation & Legal Information
 Publishing & Media Department. 
 Training Department
 Administrative Department

Recognition
CEFOD has received international recognition.

See also
 List of Jesuit sites

References  

Education in Chad
Educational organisations based in Chad
Jesuit development centres
Educational institutions established in 1966
Social welfare charities